The 1972 Individual Speedway World Championship was the 27th edition of the official World Championship to determine the world champion rider.

The 1972 final attendance at Wembley Stadium was 75,000. New Zealander Ivan Mauger joined Barry Briggs on four title wins (2nd only behind Ove Fundin) by defeating Bernt Persson in a run-off after both riders finished on 13 points.

In heat five, Briggs was involved in an accident which all but ended his speedway career. Going into the first turn his front wheel was hit by Bernt Persson's bike which caused him to fall. He was then hit by the Russian riders Grigory Khlinovsky and Valery Gordeev. Briggs suffered a severe hand injury and lost the index finger on his left hand which caused him to temporarily retire from racing. Briggs had been considered one of the pre-meeting favourites and his favouritism had been firmed when he had beaten fellow New Zealander Ivan Mauger in heat 2.

To the boos of the 75,000 strong Wembley crowd, FIM referee Georg Traunspurger did not exclude Persson. Defending champion Ole Olsen was unlucky not to retain his title because in his first ride (heat 4) while challenging Swede Christer Löfqvist he fell and would score no points. He won his next four rides to finish in a clear third place.

First round
British/Commonwealth Qualifying - 16 to British/Commonwealth Final
Continental Qualifying - 16 to Continental Final
Scandinavian Qualifying - 16 to Nordic Final

British/Commonwealth Qualifying

Scandinavian Qualifying

Continental Qualifying

Third round
Nordic Final - 8 to European Final
Continental Final - 8 to European Final

Nordic Final
1 June 1972
 Norrköping
 First 8 to European Final plus 1 reserve

Continental Final
25 June 1972
 Cherkessk
 First 8 to European Final plus 1 reserve

Fourth round
European Final - 11 to World Final
British/Commonwealth Final - 5 to World Final

British/Commonwealth Final
2 August 1972
 Coventry
 First 5 to World Final

European Final
 3 September 1972
  Wroclaw
 First 11 to World Final plus 1 reserve

World Final
16 September 1972
 London, Wembley Stadium
Referee:  Georg Traunspurger

References

1972
Individual Speedway
Individual Speedway
Individual Speedway
Speedway competitions in the United Kingdom